Primera División de México (Mexican First Division) Invierno 1998 is a Mexican football tournament - one of two short tournaments that take up the entire year to determine the champions of Mexican football. It began on Friday, July 31, 1998, and ran until November 22, when the regular season ended. Pachuca was promoted to the Primera División de México thus, Veracruz was relegated to the Primera División A. In the final Necaxa defeated Guadalajara and became champions for the 3rd time.

Overview

Final standings (groups)

League table

Top goalscorers 
Players sorted first by goals scored, then by last name. Only regular season goals listed.

Source: MedioTiempo

Results

Playoffs

Bracket

Quarterfinals

Guadalajara won 5–2 on aggregate.

UNAM won 4–3 on aggregate.

3–3 on aggregate. Necaxa advanced for being the higher seeded team.

Atlas won 3–2 on aggregate.

Semifinals

Guadalajara won 2–1 on aggregate.

Necaxa won 3–2 on aggregate.

Final
First leg

Second leg

Necaxa won 2–0 on aggregate.

External links
 Mediotiempo.com (where information was obtained)

Mexico
1998–99 in Mexican football
1998A